This is a list of airlines which have an air operator's certificate issued by the Civil Aviation Authority  of Colombia.

See also 
List of defunct airlines of Colombia
List of airlines

References

 
Airlines
Colombia
Airlines
Colombia